To. Heart is the debut extended play of the South Korean girl group Fromis 9. The mini-album was released on January 24, 2018 by Stone Music. The physical version of the EP is available in two versions: "Green" and "Blue". Both of them consist of the same six tracks, including the lead single, "To Heart".

Background
In January 2018, it was announced that Fromis 9 would debut with their first mini-album after the release of their pre-debut digital single, "Glass Shoes", released on November 30, 2017.

Promotion
The group held a special showcase to present the single "To Heart" on January 24, 2018, which was a live broadcast on Naver's V Live app. They held their debut stage on January 25, 2018 on Mnet's M Countdown.

Track listing

Charts

Weekly

Monthly

Release history

References

2018 EPs
Fromis 9 EPs
Korean-language EPs
Hybe Corporation EPs